Oregon City High School is a public high school in the northwest United States in Oregon City, Oregon, a suburb south of Portland.

History
Oregon City High School was established  in 1885 on the lower level of Oregon City on Jackson Street  Due to the growing number of students in the late 1980s, a freshmen campus was established in 1989 at Moss Junior High School on the southeast side of Oregon City and the main campus had just the upper three grades  for its last fourteen years.

In the early 2000s, construction began on the Moss Campus for the new high school, often referred to as Beavercreek. With  its completion in 2003, OCHS became a four-year high school again for the 2003–04 school year. The original 1885 campus on Jackson  was closed in 2003 due to the aftereffects of multiple disasters (fires and earthquakes) and the inability to effectively repair the damage. It is now the campus for the Clackamas Academy of Industrial Sciences (CAIS), and is still in use for basketball games and other activities.

Pioneer Memorial Stadium, adjacent to the 1885 campus, continues as the OCHS venue for football, soccer, lacrosse, and track and field.

Academics

In 1985, Oregon City High School was honored in the Blue Ribbon Schools Program, the highest honor a school can receive in the United States.

Oregon City offers 14 Advanced Placement courses and is connected to Clackamas Community College, where some Oregon City Courses are taught by professors.

In 2008, 85% of the school's seniors received a high school diploma. Of 474 students, 405 graduated, 46 dropped out, five received a modified diploma, and 18 were still in high school the following year.

In 2009, The Oregonian described the school as an "overachiever" at teaching reading and math, due to its achievement scores.

Extracurricular activities

Choir
The Rendezvous Jazz Choir took first place at the Pleasant Hill Jazz festival. The OC Master Choir performed the song "Raua Needmine" (Curse Upon Iron) by the Estonian composer Veljo Tormis in the 2009 school year.

Athletics
The girls' basketball program won three consecutive USA Today girls' national championships from 1995 to 1997, as well as state championships in 1992, 1994, 1995, 1996, 1997, 1998, 2001, 2002, 2003, 2004, 2009, and 2014.  They have placed at the State Tournament 24 years in a row starting in 1987.

State Championships
 Girls' lacrosse: 2009, 2010
 Baseball: 2012
 Boys' cross country: 1996
 Girls' track & field: 1988, 1989, 2021
 Boys' Track & Field: 2017
 Dance: 1992

Controversies

Political cartoon controversy

During the 2004–2005 school year, a political cartoon drawn by a student concerning the border issue between Mexico and the United States, was taken out of context, making national news. The cartoon was a depiction of two vigilante patrolmen discussing a "point system" for the capture of illegal immigrants. Local news coverage of the issue soon expanded to national coverage, bringing aboth criticism and support for the cartoonist and the newspaper.

Social media controversy
During the 2016–2017 school year, a Twitter post that showed a group of students holding a sign that included a racial slur was released, stirring controversy. In the following days, many of the students united to express their views and opinions of the incident by walking out of the classrooms and gathering in the school courtyard.

Notable alumni
 Rebecca Anderson, Miss Oregon 2014
 Jonah Nickerson, baseball player, Detroit Tigers
 Shannon O'Keefe (né Rondeau), professional bowler, Team USA Bowling
 Ron Saltmarsh, composer
 Brad Tinsley, basketball player, Vanderbilt
 Trevor Wilson, baseball player, San Francisco Giants and Anaheim Angels
 Tyrone S. Woods, U.S. Navy Seal
 Lindsey Yamasaki, basketball player

References

External links

 Oregon City High School page at school district's website

Buildings and structures in Oregon City, Oregon
High schools in Clackamas County, Oregon
Educational institutions established in 1885
Public high schools in Oregon
1885 establishments in Oregon